Topi Saraparanta (born 25 May 1975) was a Finnish nordic combined skier who competed from 1993 to 1998. He finished eighth in the 3 x 10 km team event at the 1994 Winter Olympics in Lillehammer.

Saraparanta's best World Cup finish was fifth in the 15 km individual event three times (1994 once and 1996 twice). His only victory was in a World Cup B 15 km individual event in Finland in 1995.

At the moment he is coaching Estonian ski jumper Kaarel Nurmsalu.

External links
Nordic combined team Olympic results: 1988-2002

References

1975 births
Nordic combined skiers at the 1994 Winter Olympics
Finnish male Nordic combined skiers
Living people
Olympic Nordic combined skiers of Finland
20th-century Finnish people